Moechotypa adusta is a species of beetle in the family Cerambycidae. It was described by Pascoe in 1869. It is known from Cambodia, Vietnam, Laos, and Thailand.

References

adusta
Beetles described in 1869